Iñaki Mallona Txertudi C.P. (July 1, 1932 – May 3, 2021) was a Spanish-born prelate of the Roman Catholic Church who served as Bishop of the Diocese of Arecibo in Puerto Rico from 1992 to 2010

Biography

Early life and ordination 
Txertudi was born in Fruiz, Spain.  He was ordained into the priesthood for the Congregation of the Passion (Passionists) on March 27, 1956.

Bishop of Arecibo 
On December 14, 1991, Txertudi was appointed Bishop of the Diocese of Arecibo. He was consecrated by Pope John Paul II in Rome on January 6, 1992, with Archbishops Giovanni Re and Josip Uhac serving as co-consecrators. He was installed on January 25, 1992.

Retirement 
On September 24, 2010, Pope Benedict XVI accepted Txertudi's resignation as bishop of Arecibo.

Txertudi died at age 88 of Alzheimer's disease on May 3, 2021 at the Hogar Irma Fe Pol nursing home in Lares, Puerto Rico.

References

External links
Catholic-Hierarchy.org
Diocese of Arecibo

 

1933 births
2021 deaths
Deaths from Alzheimer's disease
People from Mungialdea
20th-century Roman Catholic bishops in Puerto Rico
21st-century Roman Catholic bishops in Puerto Rico
Passionist bishops
Spanish emigrants to Puerto Rico
Puerto Rican people of Basque descent
Roman Catholic bishops of Arecibo